Wayne Bevan (born 26 January 1953) is a former Australian rules footballer who played with Hawthorn in the Victorian Football League (VFL). He was originally from Rubicon and played for Thornton in his junior years, before moving to Ashburton in 1970. He was a member of the Hawthorn U17 premiership team in 1970. Originally Zoned to Geelong, he played for Tooronga / Malvern in the VAFL, where he was picked up to play for Hawthorn in 1972 "issues arose at the time, with Geelong claiming he was Zoned to them. He met with Eric McCutchan OBE and Jack Hamilton "Administrators" at the VFL and after deliberation, he was cleared to play with Hawthorn, albeit he was living in the Richmond Zone at the time.

Arriving at Hawthorn in 1972, he was a tall lad who settled at Full Forward for the reserves, (he kicked 57 goals "home and away season" with all up 66 goals "covering finals"), this included 4 goals in the winning 1972 VFL Reserves Grand Final.

In 1973 he kicked 36 goals from 15 games in his first season of senior football, including five goals in a game on three occasions, he only kicked one more goal from five games over the next two seasons.

In 1976 he left for South Australia and played with Centrals Districts (18 games and 14 goals) in the SANFL. After twelve months, he returned to Victoria and played in the VFA for Dandenong.

In 1982 whilst playing for Tooronga/Malvern in the South East Suburban FL he kicked 104 goals for the season. He also kicked 110 goals for Tooronga /Malvern "VAFL" in a Premiership year in 1971 as an 18 year old.

References

External links

1953 births
Living people
Australian rules footballers from Victoria (Australia)
Hawthorn Football Club players
Central District Football Club players
Dandenong Football Club players